The Prix mondial Cino Del Duca (Cino Del Duca World Prize) is an international literary award.

Origins and operations
It was established in 1969 in France by Simone Del Duca (1912–2004) to continue the work of her husband, publishing magnate Cino Del Duca (1899–1967). 

The award recognizes an author whose work constitutes, in a scientific or literary form, a message of modern humanism. The award's prize has been valued as high as 300,000 € over the years; in 2016 it was 200,000. 

In 1975, Madame Del Luca established the Simone and Cino Del Duca Foundation for a variety of philanthropic purposes and it assumed responsibility for the award. Following her death in 2004, the foundation was placed under the auspices of the Institut de France.

Honorees

References

External links
 Fondation Del Duca information

Awards established in 1969
Cino Del Duca
Humanism
Institut de France
Del Duca family
1969 establishments in France
International literary awards